The Hierarchy Open Service Interface Definition (OSID) is an Open Knowledge Initiative specification. OSIDs are programmatic interfaces which comprise a Service Oriented Architecture for designing and building reusable and interoperable software.

The Hierarchy OSID which provides a means of creating and traversing hierarchical structures of various types. These types include trees, forests, directed graphs with multiple parents, and directed acyclic graphs.

Many collections of data used throughout software systems are organized into hierarchies. Examples are management organizations, file systems, course structures, etc. The Hierarchy OSID creates a common tools for viewing and maintaining this type of structure. While these data collections have rich structures themselves, the Hierarchy OSID is concerned only with the hierarchical relationship among nodes and not what the nodes represent. It manages the structure, not the data.

References

Software architecture